Karutha Kai (metaphor for "guilty") is a 1964 Indian Malayalam-language film, directed by M. Krishnan Nair and produced by P. Subramaniam. The film stars Prem Nazir, Sheela, Adoor Bhasi and Thikkurissy Sukumaran Nair. It was released on 14 August 1964. The film was remade in Telugu as Loguttu Perumallakeruka.

Plot

Cast 
Prem Nazir as Basu
Sheela as Latha
K. V. Shanthi as  Radha
S. P. Pillai as  Detective
Adoor Bhasi as Detective
Thikkurissy Sukumaran Nair as  Thambi
Mannoor Velayudhan Pillai as police officer
Jose Prakash as  Vikraman
Aranmula Ponnamma
Baby Vinodini
Kundara Bhasi
Paravoor Bharathan as  Khader

Soundtrack 
The music was composed by M. S. Baburaj and the lyrics were written by Thirunayinaarkurichi Madhavan Nair.

References

External links 
 

1960s Malayalam-language films
1964 films
Films directed by M. Krishnan Nair
Malayalam films remade in other languages